Bomy is a commune in the Pas-de-Calais department in the Hauts-de-France region in northern France.

Geography
Bomy is situated 12 miles (19 km) south of the town of Saint-Omer, on the D130 road. It is surrounded by the communes of Beaumetz-lès-Aire, Erny-Saint-Julien and Laires.

Population

Sights
 The church of St. Vaast, dating from the thirteenth century.
 The remains of the old château, where a truce between France and Spain was signed in 1537.
 The present-day château. The building dates from 1755. It was confiscated during the French Revolution and sold for use as a sugar beet factory. It was sold again in 1839 to the Baron de Vilmarest.

See also
Communes of the Pas-de-Calais department

References

Communes of Pas-de-Calais